George Perry Abraham FRPS (1846 – 10 April 1923) was a British photographer, postcard publisher, and mountaineer.

Early life
George Perry Ashley Abraham was born in Devizes, Wiltshire, in 1846.

Career
He worked as a photographer with Elliot & Fry of Baker Street, London, before becoming apprenticed to Alfred Pettitt in Keswick in 1862, and then starting his own business in 1866.

Abraham did studio portraits, but his passion was for photographing landscapes. He founded G. P. Abraham Ltd, a postcard publisher, in Keswick in England's Lake District, and became a Fellow of the Royal Photographic Society in 1898.

Personal life
In 1870, he married Mary Dixon in Cockermouth, Cumberland.

He had four sons. The two eldest, George and Ashley Abraham, were important popularisers of mountain climbing. Sidney was a bank manager in Keswick, and John Abraham became acting Governor of Tanganyika.

Abraham died in 1923.

Legacy
The photography business was carried on by Ashley's son, before being wound up in the 1970s.

References

External links
 Photographs of the Alps by G.P. Abraham at Harvard Art Museums.

1844 births
1923 deaths
Photographers from Cumbria
British rock climbers
People from Keswick, Cumbria
Postcard publishers